Porela delineata is a moth of the  family Lasiocampidae. It is known from Australia, including New South Wales, Queensland and Victoria.

The wingspan is about 30 mm. Adults are grey with an intricate pattern of white and brown on the forewings. Each forewing has a white spot near the middle. The hindwings are plain off-white, often with a diffuse darker band.

The larvae feed on Eucalyptus leucoxylon and Leptospermum species. They are grey with long hairs. There are black tufts along the back, and the head has two black stripes. Pupation takes place in a white elliptical cocoon spun among the leaves of their food plant.

References

Lasiocampidae
Moths described in 1855